Vilnius Central Railway Station is a Lithuanian Railways passenger station in Vilnius, Lithuania. The railway station situates between two neighbourhoods of Vilnius - Naujininkai and Naujamiestis and on the edge of the Old Town.

History
The station was opened in 1861 while building the Saint Petersburg–Warsaw Railway. It was destroyed in 1945 during World War II and in 1950 it was rebuilt in socialist realism style. The building was renovated in 2001.

Currently there are ticket offices, vending kiosks open inside the station building, a bar Peronas (lit. "platform") is working inside the former railway postal building.

Train services
The main local railroads connecting with the railway station are Vilnius–Klaipėda Railway, Vilnius–Kaunas Railway and Vilnius–Turmantas Railway.

The station is served by the following local and international passenger services:
 Vilnius – Kaunas
 Vilnius – Trakai
 Vilnius – Šiauliai – Klaipėda
 Vilnius – Ignalina – Turmantas
 Vilnius – Varėna – Marcinkonys
 Vilnius – Kena
 Vilnius – Vilnius Airport - Jašiūnai
 Vilnius - Mockava - Warsaw -  Kraków
Services were previously offered to Russia, Belarus, Ukraine, and Riga but were suspended in March 2020 due to the COVID-19 pandemic. Services between mainland Russia and Kaliningrad, which travel through Vilnius, have resumed, but trains do not stop at the station. All services to these destinations run through Belarus, and Lithuanian Railways has stated that as of June 2022, they have no intentions of restarting passenger services to Belarus in the foreseeable future. There were previously services to Daugavpils, Latvia, but they were also cut in March 2020 and no information has been released on when and if this route will be resumed.

Public transportation

The station is a major Vilnius public transportation hub. The station can be reached by city public transport:  trolleybuses, regular, fast and night buses. Vilnius bus station is around 180 meters (590 ft) away from the railway station. Vilnius international airport situates 3 kilometers (1.9 mi) away from the railway station and is accessible by taxi, busses and trains. Trains operated by LTG Link departure from Vilnius railway station everyday and arrives to Vilnius Airport railway station.

See also
 Rail transport in Lithuania
 Vilnius Airport Railway Station
 Rail Baltica

References
 

Railway stations in Vilnius
Railway stations opened in 1861
1861 establishments in the Russian Empire